Albert Edward 'Bertie' Sharp (20 February 1911 – 21 September 2006) was an Australian rules footballer who played with Footscray in the Victorian Football League (VFL).

Sharp later served in the Australian Army during World War II.

Notes

External links 

1911 births
2006 deaths
Australian rules footballers from Victoria (Australia)
Western Bulldogs players